KOXC may refer to:

 KOXC-LP, a low-power radio station (107.9 FM) licensed to serve Oxnard, California, United States
 Waterbury–Oxford Airport (ICAO code KOXC)